The Universal Sport Exhibition was a world's fair held in Stockholm, Sweden between 27 July and 13 August 1949. It was a special exhibition centered on the sports in the world.
37 countries participated in the exhibition.

External links
Official website of the BIE

World's fairs in Stockholm
International sports competitions in Stockholm
1949 in Swedish sport
1940s in Stockholm
July 1949 sports events in Europe
August 1949 sports events in Europe